William Horner (born 7 September 1942 in Cassop, England) is an English footballer and manager.

Horner played at Middlesbrough from 1960 to 1969, primarily as a defender. He moved on to Darlington where he played until 1975.

He joined York City as a coach in 1971 under Tom Johnston and was released in January 1972 following a behind the scenes player’s dispute.

He was player-manager of Darlington during the 1974–75 season, in which the club had to apply for re-election. He left the club at the end of the season and was appointed as coach to Darlington's arch-rivals Hartlepool. In October 1976, he took over as manager, and had two separate spells in this role: one from 1976–1983 and the other from 1983–1986. Although Hartlepool applied for re-election to the League on three occasions, Horner also guided the club to a respectable 9th-place finish in 1980–81, during which the club had been promotion contenders. In his second spell at the club, Hartlepool finished 7th in 1985–86, in which they had also been a promotion contender for much of the season.

Managerial stats

References

External links
Career Stats

1942 births
Living people
English footballers
English football managers
Middlesbrough F.C. players
Darlington F.C. players
Darlington F.C. managers
Hartlepool United F.C. managers
Association football central defenders
Hartlepool United F.C. non-playing staff
York City F.C. non-playing staff